Amounis was an Australian Thoroughbred Hall of Fame racehorse. He won 33 races over distances ranging from 6 to 12 furlongs (1,200 to 2,400 metres). Of these wins, 27 were in "Principal Races" (equivalent to today's Group races or "Black Type" races), 16 of these races have since been promoted to Group One (G1) status. In winning the AJC Epsom Handicap he established a new Australasian record time.

Breeding
He was a brown gelding bred by Percy Miller and foaled in 1922 at his Kia Ora Stud, Scone, New South Wales.  Amounis was by the outstanding racehorse and sire, Magpie (GB), his dam Loved One was a good racehorse and broodmare by Duke of Melton (GB). Loved One produced 14 foals, of which 8 raced and 5 of these were winners.

Racing career
Amounis was sold as a yearling to a Sydney trainer, J.W. Cook. He started twice as a two-year-old, without success. During a spell (rest) while he was recuperating from a leg injury he was gelded. Amounis then developed into a good type of three-year-old and was sold to Paddy Wade for 2,500 guineas. Wade then raced him for a short season when he ran fourth to Manfred in the AJC and Victorian Derbies. Amounis was sold again when  Wade left Australia. This time he was purchased by trainer, Frank McGrath on behalf of  William Pearson for 1,800 guineas.

As a three-year-old in 1925-26 he started 13 times for 6 wins including the AJC Hobartville Stakes and Rosehill Guineas.

As a four-year-old in 1926-27 he started 12 times for 6 wins including the Epsom Handicap (in Australasian record time), VRC Cantala Stakes, Chipping Norton Stakes, W. S. Cox Plate and 1926 Linlithgow Stakes.

As a five-year-old in 1927-28 he started 19 times for 3 weight for age (wfa) race wins, including the W. S. Cox Plate and 1927 VRC Linlithgow Stakes.

As a six-year-old in 1928-29 he started eight times for four wins including the Craven Plate, AJC Epsom Handicap, Tatt's NSW Tramway Handicap and WmtnRC Williamstown Cup.

Amounis had to compete as a seven and eight-year-old, against Phar Lap in great form, as a three- and four-year-old. As a seven-year-old in 1929-30 Amounis started 16 times for 10 wins including the CPRC Canterbury Stakes (with a record weight), VRC CB Fisher Plate, VRC Cantala Stakes, VRC Linlithgow Stakes, Rosehill Stakes, VATC Futurity Stakes, VATC St George Stakes, 1930 VRC C.M. Lloyd Stakes, VRC Essendon Stakes and 1930 AJC All-Aged Stakes.

As an eight-year-old in 1930-31 he started eight times for four wins including the 1930 Warwick Stakes, VATC Caulfield Cup, carrying 9 st 8 lbs (61 kilograms), VATC Caulfield Stakes and VRC October Stakes. In the 1930 Warwick Stakes, he defeated Phar Lap by a short head to deprive Phar Lap of 24 successive victories. Before this race, Phar Lap had won nine consecutive races. Phar Lap then went on to score another 14 consecutive wins.

At the end of his six-year-old days, he had 19 wins including the Cox Plate but Amounis came back better than ever for his next two seasons. As a seven-year-old, he won nine races (including one over Phar Lap), finishing no worse than third on just one occasion in 16 starts.

1930 racebook

Race record

At nine years: 1931-32 Did not race

Pedigree

See also
Glossary of Australian and New Zealand punting

References

External links
The Virtual FormGuide
Australian Museum and Racing Hall of Fame: Amounis
Thoroughbred Village

1922 racehorse births
Racehorses bred in Australia
Racehorses trained in Australia
Australian Racing Hall of Fame horses
Caulfield Cup winners
Cox Plate winners
Thoroughbred family 5